is a former Japanese football player.

Club statistics

References

External links

J. League (#27)

1991 births
Living people
Association football people from Tokyo
Japanese footballers
J2 League players
Yokohama FC players
Giravanz Kitakyushu players
Association football midfielders